Sterculia rubiginosa is a plant species, belonging to the genus Sterculia and the family Malvaceae (previously the Sterculiaceae, now relegated to a subfamily).  The species can be found in the Andaman and Nicobar islands, Myanmar (Burma), southern Thailand, Malesia (Java, peninsular Malaysia, Sumatra, Singapore, Borneo, Sulawesi), the Philippines and Vietnam (where it is known as bảy rừa lông [sét]).

Subspecies 
Three subspecies are listed in the Catalogue of Life:
 S. r. divaricata
 S. r. glabrescens
 S. r. setistipula

References

External links
 

rubiginosa
Flora of Malesia
Flora of Indo-China
Flora of the Philippines
Flora of Vietnam